The Secret History of Vampires is an anthology of original fantasy/horror historical short stories edited by American writer Darrell Schweitzer. It was first published in paperback by DAW Books in April 2007.

Summary
The book collects thirteen novelettes and short stories by various authors, with an introduction by the editor.

Contents
"Introduction" (Darrell Schweitzer)
"Under St. Peter's" (Harry Turtledove)
"Two Hunters in Manhattan" (Mike Resnick)
"Smoke and Mirrors" (P. D. Cacek)
"Garbo Quits" (Ron Goulart)
"Blood of Dreams" (Sarah A. Hoyt)
"A Princess of Spain" (Carrie Vaughn)
"Harpy" (Chelsea Quinn Yarbro)
"Honored Be Her Name" (John Gregory Betancourt and Darrell Schweitzer)
"Ill-Met in Ilium" (Gregory Frost)
"The Temptation of Saint Anthony" (Brian Stableford)
"Bohemian Rhapsody" (Ian Watson)
"Green Wallpaper" (Tanith Lee)
"Sepulchres of the Undead" (Keith Taylor)
"About the Authors"

Notes

2007 anthologies
Vampires in written fiction
Horror anthologies
Darrell Schweitzer anthologies
DAW Books books